Paul Childress is an American powerlifter.  He holds the World Powerlifting Organization (WPO) world record in the 308 lb. weight class with a squat of 1147.5 lb. and has the third best total in the world with 2662.1 lb. He has been a major part of the fitness industry for 25 years.

In 2004 at the GNC Show of Strength WPO Childress became the first man in the 308 lb. weight class to squat over 1100 lb.
and win the 308 and SHW weight class.

Childress is the Head Strength Coach for the Buffalo Bulls.  Prior to joining UB, Childress worked at Total Health and Fitness as director of facilities and fitness management.  He also continues to be a consultant for elite fitness systems (a powerlifting and strength organization) and sells powerlifting gear. He works with over 28 professional athletes, specialising in strength training, nutrition, athletic performance and conditioning 

Childress has a bachelor's degree in health and wellness from  Buffalo State and a master's degree in physical education from Canisius. He was a 3 time All-American at Buffalo State in football 

In 1978, he was watching on TV the WSM competition which later inspired him to become a powerlifter. In 1978, he received for Christmas a training kit consisting of weights and dumbbells and that was a pivotal moment in his life.

References

Profile at Buffalo Athletics

External links
World Powerlifting Organization (WPO)

American powerlifters
Living people
Place of birth missing (living people)
Year of birth missing (living people)
Canisius College alumni
Buffalo Bulls football coaches